The Aztec Bowl is an NCAA-sanctioned college division/minor (prior to 1997); AFCA Division III (since 1997) Division II/III (since 2011) post-season bowl game that has been played intermittently since 1947. From 1947 to 1949 the event was called the Silver Bowl, and in 1950 the name was changed to the Aztec Bowl.

With but one exception, all of the games have been played at locations in Mexico; the exception was the 1957 game played in San Antonio, Texas.  From 1997 to 2008, under sponsorship of the American Football Coaches Association, the bowl had featured a team of Division III All-Stars against a team of Mexican All-Stars.  360 Sports Events Division II/III All American Eagles took over sponsoring players, along with ONEFA in 2010.

Games played in 1970 and 1980 are considered junior college bowl games, and games played in 1947, 1948, 1952, and 1996 are considered military bowl games. No games were played in 1954-1956, 1958–1963, 1967–1969, 1972–1978, 1981–1983, 1985, and 1995.  The games are traditionally played in mid-December.

Under the new format there were no games in 2008 and 2010 because of lack of sponsors.  In 2011, the Aztec Bowl All-Star Game resumed play in Chihuahua, Mexico. *There was no game in 2013 because of venue issues in Mexico.

The Aztec Bowl has always been an International Bowl Game, however in 1997 the Aztec Bowl was re-formed into a Bowl Game between Small College All-Stars from the United States and Mexico, billed as Team USA vs. Team Mexico. It has become prestigious for Team USA or Team Mexico to win the Aztec Bowl, because they are trying to win it for their country.

Results by year

See also
List of college bowl games
IFAF U-19 World Cup
World University American Football Championship

References

College football bowls
American football in Mexico